The G.I. Robot is the name of a series of six fictional robots that appeared in comic books published by DC Comics. The first four G.I. Robot characters were all created by writer Robert Kanigher, though each was designed by a different artist. Each incarnation of the G.I. Robot is an android of advanced, experimental technology designed to carry out combat and rescue missions. Multiple versions of the G.I. Robot seem to develop their own free will, as well as loyalty and a sense of friendship towards human soldiers they work alongside.

The first G.I. Robot, nicknamed Joe and designed by Ross Andru, first appeared in Star Spangled War Stories (volume 1) #101 (published in late 1961, with a cover date of February–March 1962). Joe appeared in three stories before being dropped from the comic. A second G.I. Robot named Mac the Second appeared in one story in Star Spangled War Stories #125 (February–March 1966), written by Robert Kanigher and with art by Joe Kubert. The third G.I. Robot J.A.K.E. 1, created by Kanigher and artist Pepe Morino Casaras, debuted in Weird War Tales (vol. 1) #101 (July 1981). This model was followed a year later by J.A.K.E. 2 in Weird War Tales #113 (July 1982), by Kanigher and Fred Carrillo.

A newer model of the G.I. Robot, designed by Lex Luthor for use by the United States military, was introduced in Batman Confidential #4, by Andy Diggle and Whilce Portacio. Subsequently, J.A.K.E. #6.1 appeared in Checkmate (vol. 2) #24 (May 2008), created by Greg Rucka and Eric Trautmann.

Fictional character biographies

Joe
During World War II, the Pentagon authorizes the development of robotic soldiers to aid and protect U.S. military troops. The project is overseen by Prof. Zurin. These artificial soldiers are designated "G.I. Robots", a reference to the World War I habit of using the initials "G.I." when referring to general items of military equipment, and eventually to service members, for the US Army and US Airforce (the initials later came to be interpreted as "Government Issue" or "General Issue"). The first prototype G.I. Robot ready for field combat is nicknamed "Joe" (a reference to "G.I. Joe", a World War II slang term used to refer to members of the US Army and Airforce). Joe is a humanoid, mannequin-like robot with a visible control panel, as well as eyes and an indication of facial features but no mouth. Professor Zurin designs Joe to have "practically every response we could think of which might come up in combat." Joe is built to respond to spoken command, as well as "the sounds of weapons, ammo, and machines."

For his first field experience, Joe is assigned to the act as assistant to Ranger unit Corporal named Mac. The next day, Mac and Joe are assigned to investigate an island. While parachuting, high winds cause them to go off course and land on another island nearby that is inhabited by extinct creatures, a place that comes to later be called simply Dinosaur Island. Despite Joe misunderstanding some of Mac's commands, the robot provides invaluable assistance to the Ranger and they are able to escape the island.

After Prof. Zurin upgrades the robot to respond to light signals as well (such as the beam of a flashlight striking him), Joe and Mac engage on several more adventures on or near Dinosaur Island. These missions become collectively known as "The War that Time Forgot." During one mission, Joe and Mac encounter a giant "TNT Robot" developed by the military of Japan. During this battle, Mac is confused when the giant robot and Joe pause their combat and seem to stare at each other, followed by Joe then destroying the enemy robot with great ferocity. Afterward, Mac tries to ask Joe if he is becoming more than simply a machine and a robot, but Joe does not respond.

Mac
Some time after Joe's destruction, a soldier named Reed is assigned to a "top secret Ranger outfit" specially trained for missions no ordinary soldier was expected to survive (an early version of the covert operation team known as Task Force X or the "Suicide Squad"). During one mission, Reed is assigned to work alongside a new G.I. Robot who resembles Joe but has a visible nose added to his face. This android is referred to as Mac the Second and Reed is told this is because there had been a previous G.I. Robot named Mac who also worked with a soldier but that both were eventually lost and designated "missing in action." Reed simply refers to the robot as "Mac" rather than his full designation.

Reed is suspicious of Mac but comes to rely on the robot's help as they encounter danger on Dinosaur Island. During their mission, they come across a soldier maddened by witnessing the deaths of his fellow combatants. Believing Mac has a personality and might be developing genuine loyalty, Reed attempts to shake the robot's hand. Mac seems to respond but then the maddened soldier opens fire on them. Mac shields Reed with his robot body and moment later a tyrannosaurus arrives, ready to attack. Mac saves Reed by charging at the dinosaur with a grenade and detonating it, destroying them both.

J.A.K.E. 1
Some time after the destruction of Mac the Second, Professor Thompson leads a think tank at MIT that develops a new version of the G.I. Robot, one with built-in weaponry, more advanced technology, and a more obviously robotic appearance. Thompson's team names this new G.I. Robot "J.A.K.E. #1" (Jungle Automatic Killer - Experimental Number 1). For its first mission, J.A.K.E. 1 is deployed to a Pacific island alongside the Marines to fight the Japanese military and placed under the control of Sergeant Coker. Like the soldiers Mac and Reed before him, Coker is skeptical of the robot's ability and suspicious it may be too dangerous to trust.

During J.A.K.E. 1's first mission with Coker, the robot's control panel is destroyed, which should render it inert. Despite this, the robot still acts to protect Coker, carrying the injured marine all the way back to camp despite not being instructed to do so. Realizing the G.I. Robot somehow developed the capacity to choose to protect him, Coker gains respect for J.A.K.E. 1, referring to him as "the best." While undergoing surgery for his wounds, Coker even insists that the doctors first focus on repairing J.A.K.E. 1.

Following his surgery, Coker willingly goes on further missions with J.A.K.E. 1. Though he teases the robot for being "a mess o' nuts and bolts" who has no feelings, Coker also sees evidence to the contrary and shakes J.A.K.E. 1's hand on day, telling the G.I. Robot he is a true marine and his "buddy." Coker's loyalty to J.A.K.E. 1 becomes so strong that he even risks his own life to save the G.I. Robot from an enemy's grenade, resulting in serious injury. As Coker is taken away on a ship to receive medical attention, J.A.K.E. 1 is ordered to erase Coker from his memory banks and follow a new marine. Rather than do so, J.A.K.E. 1 leaves and attempts to swim after the ship Coker is on. He fails to reach it and instead comes across the Creature Commandos, a U.S. military unit comprising monster-like operatives. J.A.K.E. 1 joins the Creature Commandos and soon sacrifices himself to save them from certain death. The Creature Commando operative known as Dr. Medusa tells her comrades she believes J.A.K.E. 1 developed a soul.

J.A.K.E. 2
Weeks after the destruction of J.A.K.E. 1, his successor J.A.K.E. Number 2 is sent to the Pacific islands to join the marines there. On activation, J.A.K.E. 2 seems unresponsive at first but then acts to defend the marine camp from a samurai robot built by the Japanese military. After defeating the robot, J.A.K.E. 2 engages in several missions in the Pacific Theater, as well as on Dinosaur Island. Eventually, he also meets the Creature Commandos and is accepted into their ranks. Later on, J.A.K.E. 2 and the Creature Commandos are aboard a rocket that misfires and heads into deep space. The Creature Commandos are known to have survived, but J.A.K.E. 2's fate is unknown. The DC Comics Encyclopedia describes J.A.K.E. 2 as having survived into the 31st century. However, the Creature Commandos later gained possession of an entire army of mass-produced J.A.K.E.s. It is still unknown whether one of them is the original J.A.K.E. 2.

J.A.K.E. #6.1
In Checkmate (vol. 2) #24, a new G.I. Robot is revealed, with the designation J.A.K.E. #6.1. It is one of the organization's Rooks, a team of four elite operatives of last resort. Apparently constructed using the original World War II era programming, it has a new body made of components formerly used by the industrialist/murderer Maxwell Lord during a time when his consciousness was contained in an android form.

Lord Job
A new G.I. Robot of unknown origin appears in the 2008-2009 The War That Time Forgot miniseries written by Bruce Jones, where it is known as "Lord Job", but calls himself "Joe". This version can speak and has bright red eyes, but is otherwise of a similar appearance to the earlier models, particularly Joe. It has not been established from which time period it comes.

Powers and abilities
The G.I. Robots are all fully autonomous mechanical soldiers, capable of making decisions and adapting to changes in their environment. Joe responds to spoken commands as well as the sound of weapons fire and machines, and in situations where voice commands are impractical, to light signals flashed on its control panel. Mac responds similarly, but appears to be smarter, and has no control panel. No built-in weapons are apparent, but both are capable of using firearms like an ordinary soldier and can withstand direct fire from small arms.

J.A.K.E.s 1 and 2 are also armor-plated models. Their left arms consist of a fully functional machine gun, which can fire bullets, mini-torpedoes, and small anti-aircraft missiles. They can also fly for short distances, thanks to small rockets in their boots.

J.A.K.E. #6.1, unlike its predecessors, can communicate verbally, appears to have a sophisticated artificial intelligence system, and is equipped with various weapons, including a minigun as its left arm, an automatic grenade launcher mounted on its right shoulder and magnetically accelerated anti-personnel caltrops deployed from its chest cavity. Its role during missions is to monitor its fellow Rooks, who are telepathically linked thanks to an alien DNA infusion derived from Starro the Conqueror. If J.A.K.E. determines the DNA is gaining control, it will terminate the link by killing its teammates.

Lord Job is also capable of speech and has some degree of superhuman strength and resilience. He does however seem to be completely artificial, with no sign of a human will or even a facsimile of same, unlike most of his predecessors. He has shown some tactical analysis and personal combat skills. He has suffered some damage before ever being seen. He has not demonstrated built-in weapons of any kind.

While J.A.K.E. 1 and #6.1 are unique beings, there currently exist a whole army of J.A.K.E. 2s, apparently sporting the same abilities and equipment of the original.

Other versions

Flashpoint
In the alternate timeline of the Flashpoint event, the G.I. Robot replaces Frankenstein and the Creature Commandos after they were deemed obsolete by Robert Crane's government services. In the modern era, Robert Crane revives the G.I. Robot to eliminate Frankenstein and the Creatures of the Unknown after they escape from the lab facility. During attacks from the Creatures of the Unknown in a Gotham City forest, the G.I. Robot sprang at Frankenstein to subdue him, but a Creatures of the Unknown member severed the G.I. Robot's head.

In other media
 The G.I. Robot appears in the teaser for the Batman: The Brave and the Bold episode "The Plague of the Prototypes!", voiced by James Arnold Taylor. He and Sgt. Rock team up with Batman to stop Nazi soldiers before sacrificing himself to save Sgt. Rock from a landmine.
 The G.I. Robot will appear in the HBO Max / DC Universe DCEU animated miniseries Creature Commandos as a member of the eponymous team.

References

External links
 Creature Commandos at Cosmic Teams 

DC Comics robots
Fictional soldiers
Fictional World War II veterans
War comics
G.I. Robot (Joe)
G.I. Robot (Mac)
G.I. Robot (J.A.K.E. 1)
G.I. Robot (J.A.K.E. 2)
G.I. Robot (Lord Job)
Characters created by Robert Kanigher
Characters created by Ross Andru
DC Comics characters with superhuman strength
DC Comics military personnel
DC Comics set during World War II